The June solstice is the solstice on Earth that occurs annually between 20 and 22 June according to the Gregorian calendar. In the Northern Hemisphere, the June solstice is the summer solstice (the day with the longest period of daylight), while in the Southern Hemisphere it is the winter solstice (the day with the shortest period of daylight). It is also known as the northern solstice.

Solar year
The June solstice solar year is the solar year based on the June solstice. It is thus the length of time between adjacent June solstices.

The length of the day on June solstice

See also

Astronomy 

 March equinox
 September equinox
 December solstice

Holidays 

 Holi
 Inti Raymi
 Kupala Night
 Midnight sun
 Midsummer
 We Tripantu
 World Humanist Day

References

Calendars
Astronomical events of the Solar System
Solstice